Les Amoureux de la France is a national-conservative political alliance launched in 2018 for the 2019 European Parliament election in France. The alliance contains the CNIP, the PCD and Nicolas Dupont-Aignan's party, Debout la France.

References

Political party alliances in France
Right-wing parties in France
Debout la France